Gladys Taylor may refer to:

Gladys Taylor (athlete) (born 1953), British sprinter
Gladys Taylor (nurse) (1890–1950), Matron-in-Chief, Princess Mary's Royal Air Force Nursing Service
Gladys Taylor (publisher) (1917–2015), Canadian writer and publisher

See also
Gladys Tayler
 Gladys (given name)